Under UNESCO’s Man and the Biosphere Programme, there are 125 biosphere reserves recognized as part of the World Network of Biosphere Reserves in Latin America and the Caribbean (as of April, 2016). These are distributed across 21 countries in the region.

The list
Below is the list of biosphere reserves in Latin America and the Caribbean, organized by country/territory, along with the year these were designated as part of the World Network of Biosphere Reserves.

Argentina

 San Guillermo (1980)
 Laguna Blanca (1982)
 Costero del Sur (1984)
 Ñacuñán (1986)
 Pozuelos (1990)
 Yabotí (1995)
 Mar Chiquita (1996)
 Delta del Paraná (2000)
 Riacho Teuquito (2000)
 Laguna Oca del Río Paraguay (2001)
 Las Yungas (2002)
 Andino Norpatagonica (2007)
 Lanín National Park
 Nahuel Huapi National Park
 Los Arrayanes National Park
 Lago Puelo National Park
 Los Alerces National Park
 Pereyra Iraola (2007)
 Valdés (2014)
 Patagonia Azul (2015)

Bolivia

 Pilon-Lajas (1977)
 Ulla Ulla (1977)
 Beni (1986)

Brazil

 Mata Atlântica (including São Paulo Green Belt) (1993)
 Cerrado (1993)
 Pantanal (2000)
 Caatinga (2001)
 Central Amazon (2001)
 Espinhaço Range (2005)

Chile

 Fray Jorge (1977)
 Juan Férnandez (1977)
 Torres del Paine (1978)
 Laguna San Rafael (1979)
 Lauca (1981)
 Araucarias (1983)
 La Campana-Peñuelas (1984)
 Cabo de Hornos (2005)
 Bosques Templados Lluviosos de los Andes Australes (2007)
 Corredor Biológico Nevados de Chillán - Laguna del Laja (2011)

Colombia

 Cinturón Andino (1979)
 Cueva de los Guácharos
 Puracé
 Nevado del Huila
 El Tuparro (1979)
 Sierra Nevada de Santa Marta (1979)
 Ciénaga Grande de Santa Marta (2000)
 Seaflower (2000)

Costa Rica

 La Amistad International Park (1982)
 Cordillera Volcánica Central (1988, extended in 2010)
 Aqua y Paz (2007)
 Savegre Reserve (2017)

Cuba

 Sierra del Rosario (1984)
 Cuchillas del Toa (1987)
 Península de Guanahacabibes (1987)
 Baconao (1987)
 Ciénaga de Zapata (2000)
 Buenavista (2000)

Dominican Republic
 Jaragua-Bahoruco-Enriquillo (2002) (merged with adjacent Haiti's La Selle in 2017)

Ecuador

 Archipiélago de Colón (Galápagos) (1984)
 Yasuni (1989)
 Sumaco (2000)
 Podocarpus-El Condor (2007)
 Macizo del Cajas (2013)	 	 
 Bosque Seco (2014)
 Bosques de Paz (2017, shared with Peru)
 Choco Andino de Pichincha (2018)

El Salvador

 Apaneca-Llamatepec (2007)
 Coatepeque Caldera
 Izalco
 Xiriualtique Jiquilisco (2007)
 Trifinio Fraternidad Transboundary Biosphere Reserve (El Salvador/Guatemala/Honduras) (2011)

Guadeloupe
 Guadeloupe National Park

Guatemala

 Maya (1990)
 Sierra de las Minas (1992)
 Trifinio Fraternidad Transboundary Biosphere Reserve (El Salvador/Guatemala/Honduras) (2011)

Haiti
 La Selle (2012) (merged with adjacent Jaragua-Bahoruco-Enriquillo, Dominican Republic, in 2017.)
 La Hotte (2016)

Honduras

 Río Plátano (1980)
 Trifinio Fraternidad Transboundary Biosphere Reserve (El Salvador/Guatemala/Honduras) 2011 (extended in 2016)
 Cacique Lempira, Señor de las Montañas  (2015)
 San Marcos de Colón (2017)

Mexico

 Mapimí (1977)
 La Michilía (1977)
 Montes Azules (1979)
 El Cielo (1986)
 Sian Ka'an (1986)
 Sierra de Manantlán Biosphere Reserve (1988)
 Calakmul (1993)
 El Triunfo (1993)
 El Vizcaíno (2021)
 Alto Golfo de California (1993)
 Alto Golfo de California (1995)
 Sierra Gorda (2001)
 Banco Chinchorro (2003)
 Sierra La Laguna (2003)
 Ría Celestún (2004)
 Ría Lagartos (2004)
 Cumbres de Monterrey (2006)
 Huatulco (2006)
 La Encrucijada (2006)
 La Primavera (2006)
 La Sepultura (2006)
 Laguna Madre and Río Bravo Delta (2006)
 Los Tuxtlas (2006)
 Maderas del Carmen (2006)
 Mariposa Monarca (2006)
 Pantanos de Centla (2006)
 Selva El Ocote (2006)
 Sierra de Huautla (2006)
 Volcán Tacaná (2006)
 Arrecife Alacranes (2006)
 Barranca de Metztitlán (2006)
 Chamela-Cuixmala (2006)
 Cuatrocienagas (2006)
 Sistema Arrecifal Veracruzano (2006)
 Sierra de Álamos–Río Cuchujaqui (2007)
 Islas Marietas (2008)
 Lagunas de Montebello (2009)
 Naha-Metzabok (2010)
 Los Volcanes (2010)
 Islas Marías (2010)
 Tehuacán-Cuicatlán (2012)
 Isla Cozumel (2016)

Nicaragua

 Bosawas (1997)
 Río San Juan (2003)
 Ometepe Island (2010)

Panama

 Darién National Park (1983)
 La Amistad International Park (2000)

Paraguay

 Bosque Mbaracayú (2000)
 El Chaco (2005)
 Itaipu (2017), part of Alto Paraná Atlantic forests

Peru

 Huascarán (1977)
 Manu (1977)
 Noroeste Amotapes–Manglares (1977, expanded and renamed 2016)
 Cerros de Amotape National Park
 El Angolo Game Preserve
 Tumbes Reserved Zone
 Tumbes Mangals National Sanctuary
 Oxapampa-Ashaninka-Yanesha (2010)
 Yanachaga–Chemillén National Park
 San Matías–San Carlos Protection Forest
 Yanesha Communal Reservation
 El Sira Communal Reserve
 Gran Pajatén (2016)
 Rio Abiseo National Park
 Bosques de Paz (2017, shared with Ecuador)

Saint Kitts and Nevis
 St Mary's (2011)

Uruguay

 Bañados del Este (1976)
 Bioma Pampa-Quebradas del Norte (2014)

Venezuela

 Alto Orinoco-Casiquiare (1993)
 Delta del Orinoco (2009)

References

External links
 List of UNESCO World Network of Biosphere Reserves of Latin America and the Caribbean

+
Latin America and the Caribbean